Dato' Dr. Ahmad Yunus bin Hairi is a Malaysian politician who currently a member of Malaysian Parliament for Kuala Langat and has served as Selangor State Executive Council from 2012 till 2018.

Election Results

Honours 
  :
  Knight Commander of the Order of the Crown of Selangor (DPMS) - Dato' (2014)

References

Living people
People from Selangor
Malaysian people of Malay descent
Malaysian Muslims
Malaysian Islamic Party politicians
Members of the Selangor State Legislative Assembly
Selangor state executive councillors
21st-century Malaysian politicians
1965 births
Knights Commander of the Order of the Crown of Selangor